Raciborski may refer to:
 Racibórz County in Poland
 Jan Raciborski, canoer